Senator Hanson may refer to:

Alexander Contee Hanson (1786–1819), U.S. Senator for Maryland
Frank H. Hanson (1884–1940), Wisconsin State Senate
Gary D. Hanson (born 1949), South Dakota Senate
Gary W. Hanson (born 1950), South Dakota Senate
John Hanson (Liberian politician) (died c. 1860) Liberian Senate
Marv Hanson (1943–2004), Minnesota State Senate
Paula Hanson (born 1944), Minnesota State Senate
Peter E. Hanson (1845–1914), Minnesota State Senate
Roger L. Hanson (1925–2005), Minnesota State Senate

See also
Senator Hansen (disambiguation)